Zeyti may refer to:
 Zeyti 2
 Zeyti 3